Bouvardin is a bicyclic hexapeptide isolated from Bouvardia ternifolia. Its chemical formula is C40H48N6O10.  It is derived from the amino acid sequence Ala-Ala-Tyr-Ala-Tyr-Tyr. It has demonstrated certain anti-cancerous activities by inhibiting protein synthesis through inhibition of 80S ribosomes (eukaryotic ribosomes).

The synthetic derivative of bouvardin SVC112 suppresses cancer stem cells and inhibits growth in head and neck squamous cell carcinoma.

References 

Hexapeptides
Cyclic peptides